The Carter PAV (Personal Air Vehicle) is a two-bladed, compound autogyro developed by Carter Aviation Technologies to demonstrate slowed rotor technology. The design has an unpowered rotor mounted on top of the fuselage, wings like a conventional fixed-wing aircraft mounted underneath, and a controllable pitch pusher propeller at the rear of the fuselage. Heavy weights ( each) are placed in the rotor tips to enhance rotational energy and to reduce flapping.

Development
When the CarterCopter was damaged in 2005 due to a gear-up landing caused by pilot error, the cost of repair was deemed higher than the cost of making a new aircraft with the added benefit of incorporating lessons learned from the first aircraft. Design of the PAV was begun during 2005. Several changes and development problems occurred along the way; twin boom was deemed unnecessary, so a single boom was constructed, and flaws in rotor blades and hub were revealed during testing and then corrected.

On 16 November 2009, the AAI Corporation (a division of Textron) signed a 40-year exclusive license agreement with the company concerning all unmanned aircraft systems, one of which was intended to deliver  of cargo similar to the unmanned Kaman K-MAX, but over a future range of  compared to the demonstrated  or more of the K-MAX. The agreement committed CarterCopters to developing the technology to maturity, in exchange for exclusive rights to develop UAVs for the next 40 years. The first product in the AAI agreement was to be an autonomous slowed rotor/compound (SR/C) aircraft based on the Carter Personal Air Vehicle.

"Critical Design Review" (CDR) for AAI Corporation was performed around January 2010 when the prototype was already being built. Usually a CDR is performed before a vehicle is built.

In 2014, Carter said they bought back the license from AAI and is seeking production partners outside USA, hoping for production 3–5 years later.

Testing
The PAV was taxi tested in autumn of 2010 at Olney Airport after FAA Special Airworthiness Certificate on 27 July 2010, and performed traffic pattern movement on 2 December 2010, piloted by Larry Neal at the controls and co-pilot Robert Luna. Larry Neal was also one of the pilots of the CarterCopter at Olney in 2005.

The first flight occurred on 5 January 2011 at Olney without wings and lasted 36 minutes, which qualified Carter for a milestone payment.

Eight jump take-offs were performed. There are some electrical issues with the aircraft, and it is not in volume production.

The PAV flew traffic patterns with wings at Olney in January 2012, and has since flown winged test flights. It flew a few hours at a time, but its flight certificate restricted it to within  of Olney.

As of June 2012, development of the PAV is a year behind schedule due to various technical problems, and a delay of a further year was caused by rotor RPM software control issues. Carter received funding from the Wichita Falls Economic Development Corporation in 2010 to complete the PAV. Carter views the lack of a PAV flight simulator as a mistake, and attempts to build one. The previous CarterCopter was designed using a flight simulator.

Carter says that the PAV has a lift to drag ratio of 10–15, and reached an advance ratio of 0.85 in 2012.

According to Carter, the PAV reached Mu-1 on 7 November 2013. The PAV flew its first public show flight outside Olney when it flew to Wichita Falls later that month. Carter has applied to the FAA to change the PAVs certificate from research and development to demonstration.

The second PAV (called PAV-II, registration N210AV) was flight approved in March 2014, and demonstrated at Sun 'n Fun air festival and MacDill Air Force Base in 2014, both in Florida. In July 2014, it was displayed at Oshkosh Airshow. The first non-Carter pilots flew the aircraft in 2015.

Design

Computer aided design and X-plane flight simulation were used during development.
Unlike the twin-boom CarterCopter, the PAV has a single tailboom. A tilting mast allows the rotor to be tilted 15 degrees forward and 30 degrees aft to allow different centres of gravity and wing angle-of-attacks.

Helicopter rotors are designed to operate at a fixed RPM (within in a narrow range of a few percent), whereas Carter uses RPM ranges between 100 and 350. Most aircraft have two energy parameters (speed and altitude) which the pilot can trade between, but Carter technology attempts to use rotor rotation as a third energy parameter.

The purpose of the Slowed Rotor/Compound aircraft is to enhance the flight envelope compared to fixed-wing aircraft, helicopters and traditional autogyros, by minimizing the dangerous areas of the stall speed diagram/height-velocity diagram as well as moving the speed limit up.

The PAV has traditional airplane-like controls (Vernier type), but the stick also controls the rotor. Most controls were automated in 2011, and jump-takeoff is performed at the push of a button.
Materials used include glass fiber, aluminum, titanium, and steel, as well as autoclaved carbon/epoxy prepreg with aramid honeycomb core on the PAV-II. The tip weights had been made of tungsten, while the current (2013) are made of steel.

Suppliers for the aircraft include Blue Mountain Avionics for avionics and air-to-ground video and telemetry, and Sky Ox Oxygen Systems as the PAV is not pressurized.
60 channels of information convey sensor measurements from the aircraft to a ground computer, and 4 video cameras tape the flights. The engine is equipped with a performance enhancement system by Nitrous Express.

Operation
The PAV has flight characteristics similar to other Carter aircraft. When stationary on the ground, the engine powers up the flat pitch rotor to 370 RPM, and the engine is then disengaged from the rotor to provide full power to the propeller.

The rotor now has substantial rotational energy due to the tip weights (usable temporary eng1 equivalent to ), and the rotor blades are pitched to push air down and lift the aircraft in a jump takeoff.
While altitude is reached, the aircraft transitions into forward flight using the pusher propeller, and the rotor shifts to autorotation (windmilling) with air flowing up through the rotor.
As speed increases, the air flow increases rotor RPM like other autogyros. Once sufficient airspeed is reached (around ) for the small wings to provide lift, rotor blades are feathered to reduce rotor speed to 100 RPM and minimize drag, and lift is provided mostly by the wings when speed reaches . Rotor lift is reduced to 10%, and flight efficiency is somewhat below that of a commercial jet plane.

Specifications (PAV)

See also

References
Notes

Bibliography

Flight International article

External links
Carter Aviation PAV webpage

2010s United States experimental aircraft
Autogyros
Wichita Falls, Texas
Pusher aircraft
Slowed rotor
Single-engined piston helicopters
Aircraft first flown in 2011